Lepidodactylus herrei, known commonly as the Negros scaly-toed gecko or the white-lined smooth-scaled gecko, is a species of gecko, a lizard in the family Gekkonidae. The species is endemic to the Philippines.

Etymology
The specific name, herrei, is in honor of American ichthyologist Albert William Herre.

Geographic range
In the Philippines L. herrei is found on the islands of Cebu and Negros.

Reproduction
L. herrei is oviparous.

Subspecies
Including the nominotypical subspecies, there are two subspecies which are recognized as being valid.
Lepidodactylus herrei herrei 
Lepidodactylus herrei medianus

References

Further reading
Brown WC, Alcala AC (1978). Philippine Lizards of the Family Gekkonidae. Dumaguete City, Philippines: Silliman University. vii + 146 pp. (Lepidodactylus herrei medianus, new subspecies, p. 91).
Taylor EH (1923). "Additions to the herpetological fauna of the Philippine Islands, III". Philippine J. Sci. 22: 515-557 + Plates I-III. (Lepidodactylus herrei, new species, pp. 529–531).

Lepidodactylus
Reptiles of the Philippines
Endemic fauna of the Philippines
Taxa named by Edward Harrison Taylor
Reptiles described in 1923